Jan Vladimír Hráský (1857–1939) was a Czech architect, builder,  engineer, and hydrologist.

Hrásky is known in Slovenia as an original author of building in Neo-Renaissance style of Carniolan Provincial Manor in Ljubljana (1899–1902), where from 1919 is a seat of the University of Ljubljana, and of the National Hall in Celje, where today is a seat of municipality (construction 1895–1896). In the 1890s, he had also designed the railroad bridge in Radeče.

In 1892, the Provincial Theatre (Slovene: Deželno gledališče) in Neo-Renaissance style was built in Ljubljana, today's Ljubljana Opera House, after his and Anton Hruby design. In 1898, he built plans for constructing of water supply tower in Kranj (construction 1909–1911).

External links 

 Arhitekturni vodnik/Architectural guide

1857 births
1939 deaths
Czech architects
Czech engineers
Hydrologists